Neodymium(III) oxide or neodymium sesquioxide is the chemical compound composed of neodymium and oxygen with the formula Nd2O3. It forms very light grayish-blue hexagonal crystals. The rare-earth mixture didymium, previously believed to be an element, partially consists of neodymium(III) oxide.

Uses
Neodymium(III) oxide is used to dope glass, including sunglasses, to make solid-state lasers, and to color glasses and enamels. Neodymium-doped glass turns purple due to the absorbance of yellow and green light, and is used in welding goggles. Some neodymium-doped glass is dichroic; that is, it changes color depending on the lighting. One kind of glass named for the mineral alexandrite appears blue in sunlight and red in artificial light.
About 7000 tonnes of neodymium(III) oxide are produced worldwide each year. Neodymium(III) oxide is also used as a polymerization catalyst.

Reactions
Neodymium(III) oxide is formed when neodymium(III) nitride or neodymium(III) hydroxide is roasted in air.

Structure
Neodymium(III) oxide has a low-temperature trigonal A form in space group Pm1. This structure type is favoured by the early lanthanides. At higher temperatures it adopts two other forms, the hexagonal H form in space group P63/mmc and the cubic X form in Imm. The high-temperature forms exhibit crystallographic disorder.

References

Neodymium compounds
Sesquioxides